Josip Božić Pavletić (born 6 August 1994) is a Croatian handball player who plays for Tremblay-en-France and the Croatian national team.

He participated at the 2017 World Men's Handball Championship.

References

1994 births
Living people
Sportspeople from Split, Croatia
Croatian male handball players
Mediterranean Games medalists in handball
Mediterranean Games gold medalists for Croatia
Competitors at the 2018 Mediterranean Games